Pavino is a rural locality (a selo) and the administrative center of Pavinsky District, Kostroma Oblast, Russia. Population:

References

Notes

Sources

Rural localities in Kostroma Oblast
Pavinsky District